Vărsătura may refer to several villages in Romania:

 Vărsătura, a village in Chiscani Commune, Brăila County
 Vărsătura, a village in Jariștea Commune, Vrancea County